The 1986–87 UCLA Bruins men's basketball team represented the University of California, Los Angeles in the 1986–87 NCAA Division I men's basketball season.  The team finished 1st in the conference, and also won the 1987 Pacific-10 Conference tournament.  The Bruins competed in the 1987 NCAA Division I men's basketball tournament, losing to the Wyoming Cowboys in the round of 32.

Starting lineup

Roster

Schedule

|-
!colspan=9 style=|Regular Season

|-
!colspan=9 style=| Pac-10 Tournament

|-
!colspan=9 style=| NCAA Tournament

Source

Rankings

Team players drafted into the NBA

References

UCLA Bruins men's basketball seasons
Ucla
Ucla
Pac-12 Conference men's basketball tournament championship seasons
NCAA
NCAA